Charmaine Williams is a Canadian politician, currently serving as Associate Minister of Women's Social and Economic Opportunity. She was elected to the Legislative Assembly of Ontario in the 2022 provincial election, representing the riding of Brampton Centre as a member of the Progressive Conservative Party of Ontario.

Municipal Politics 
Williams ran for the vacant Ward 7 & 8 city council seat in the 2018 municipal election. During the campaign, Williams supported a gun amnesty buyback program and supported a municipal by-law banning the sale of marijuana within 500 meters of schools.

On October 22, 2018, Williams was elected receiving 25.76% of the vote in a 9 person race.  With her victory, Williams became the first black woman ever elected to Brampton City Council.

On May 31, 2022, during the Ontario provincial election in which Williams was a candidate, Brampton City Council passed a motion to pre-emptively appoint former city councillor Elaine Moore as William's replacement if she were to resign. The motion passed 6–5 with Williams being one of the 6 votes in favor. A court later ruled that the pre-emptive appointment violated the Municipal Act.

Provincial Politics 
On March 31, 2021, Williams was named Ontario PC candidate for the Brampton Centre riding. On June 2, 2022, she defeated NDP incumbent Sara Singh, receiving 41.36% of the vote.

On June 24, she was appointed to the Ford Ministry as Associate Minister of Women's Social and Economic Opportunity.

Electoral Record

References 

Living people
Progressive Conservative Party of Ontario MPPs
21st-century Canadian politicians
21st-century Canadian women politicians
Women MPPs in Ontario
Black Canadian politicians
Black Canadian women
Ontario municipal councillors
Politicians from Brampton
Year of birth missing (living people)
Members of the Executive Council of Ontario
Women government ministers of Canada
Women's ministers